The Polly Umrigar Award for international cricketer of the year is one of the BCCI Awards, awarded to Indian cricketers for outstanding performance in international cricket.

History 
The award was instituted in 2007, with Sachin Tendulkar being the first recipient.

Award 
The award includes a trophy, citation, and cash prize of Rs. 1.5 million.

List of recipients

References

Cricket awards and rankings
Awards established in 2007